The 30th annual Berlin International Film Festival was held from 18–29 February 1980. The Golden Bear was awarded to the American film Heartland directed by Richard Pearce and West German film Palermo oder Wolfsburg directed by Werner Schroeter.

The retrospective was dedicated to American filmmaker Billy Wilder along with a 3D films retrospective. Moritz de Hadeln became the director of the festival and increased the efforts in expansion of Berlin film market. To ease tensions with the Soviet Union due to the Cold War era at the moment, the organizers decided to withdraw the films Ninotchka and One, Two, Three from the Billy Wilder retrospective.

Jury

The following people were announced as being on the jury for the festival:
 Ingrid Thulin, actress (Sweden) - Jury President
 Betsy Blair, actress (United Kingdom)
 Mathieu Carrière, actor (France)
 Alberto Isaac, director and screenwriter (Mexico)
 Peter Kern, actor (Austria)
 Károly Makk, director and screenwriter (Hungary)
 Alexander Mitta, director and screenwriter (Soviet Union)
 Alexandre Trauner, production designer (France)
 Angel Wagenstein,  writer and director (Bulgaria)

Films in competition
The following films were in competition for the Golden Bear award:

Out of competition
 Caligula, directed by Tinto Brass (Italy, USA)
 Cruising, directed by William Friedkin (USA)

Key
{| class="wikitable" width="550" colspan="1"
| style="background:#FFDEAD;" align="center"| †
|Winner of the main award for best film in its section
|}

Retrospective
The following films were shown in the retrospective dedicated to Billy Wilder: 

The following films were shown in the retrospective dedicated to 3-D films:

Awards

The following prizes were awarded by the Jury:
 Golden Bear:
 Heartland by Richard Pearce
 Palermo oder Wolfsburg by Werner Schroeter
 Silver Bear – Special Jury Prize: Chiedo asilo by Marco Ferreri
 Silver Bear for Best Director: István Szabó for Bizalom
 Silver Bear for Best Actress: Renate Krößner for Solo Sunny
 Silver Bear for Best Actor: Andrzej Seweryn for Dyrygent
 Berlin Bear Anniversary Prize: Marigolds in August by Ross Devenish
 Honourable Mention:
 Rude Boy
 Korpinpolska
 Düşman
 FIPRESCI Award
 Solo Sunny by Konrad Wolf, Wolfgang Kohlhaase

References

External links
 30th Berlin International Film Festival 1980
 1980 Berlin International Film Festival
 Berlin International Film Festival:1980 at Internet Movie Database

30
1980 film festivals
1980 in West Germany
1980s in West Berlin
Berlin